This is a list of the albums and singles in the discography of Jed Madela.

Albums

Studio albums

Holiday albums

Compilation albums

Singles

As lead artist

Other appearances

As performer in a tribute or compilation album

As performer in a film

As performer in television series

References

Madela